Harald Smith (29 June 1879 – May 1977) was a Norwegian Nordic skier who won the Holmenkollen medal in 1904.

Career 
Smith was born in Østre Aker, a borough of the city of Oslo. After 1905 he moved to Sauze d'Oulx, Italy, and competed in the Italian Alps. In 1908, together with the Italian ski jumper Paolo Kind, Smith designed the first ski jumping hill of Italy in Bardonecchia, which was finished in 1909, and where he held a record of 43 metres. The hill was named Trampolino Campo Smith in honor of his success. He also kept the record of 45 metres on the Bolgenschanze in Davos (1909).

Smith died in Bad Ragaz. His brother Trygve was also a notable ski jumper of his time.

Ski jumping world records

References 

Holmenkollen medalists
Norwegian male Nordic combined skiers
1879 births
1977 deaths
Skiers from Oslo
20th-century Norwegian people